6 Feet Under is a compilation album by Gravediggaz, consisting of material that originally appeared on Nightmare in A-Minor and Frukwan's solo album Life. This album was released by X-ray/Cleopatra Records.

Track listing

References

Gravediggaz albums
2004 compilation albums
Cleopatra Records compilation albums
Unauthorized albums